

Events

January events
 January 1 – The Bristol and Exeter Railway, in England, is amalgamated into the Great Western Railway.

February events
 February 1 – The South Devon Railway, in England, is amalgamated into the Great Western Railway.
 February 5 – The Wiesentalbahn, which eventually became part of the Grand Duchy of Baden State Railway, opens between Schopfheim and Zell im Wiesental.

March events
 March 1 – The Atchison, Topeka & Santa Fe Railroad reaches Pueblo, Colorado.

April events
April 1
Great Northern Railway (Ireland) formed by a merger of the Irish North Western Railway, Northern Railway of Ireland and the Ulster Railway.
[[Orenste
in & Koppel]] established in Berlin as mechanical engineers, coming to specialize in railway equipment.

May events

 May 1 – The Midland Railway's Settle & Carlisle line in England is opened to passenger traffic.

June events 
 June 4 – The Transcontinental Express arrives in San Francisco 83 hours after departing New York City.
 June 20 – Passenger train service begins on the Cornwall Minerals Railway  between Fowey and Newquay.

July events
 July 3 – The first railroad in China, the partially completed Woosung Road, begins operation, connecting north Shanghai with Jiangwan. The -gauge line has been built by American and British interests.

August events
 August 3 – The Woosung Road runs over and kills a Chinese soldier on the tracks. The British Consular Court will find the driver David Banks innocent of manslaughter, but the ensuing public outcry pressures both sides towards a Chinese purchase of the line.

September events

 September 1 – The official groundbreaking ceremony for the Miami Valley Railway is held in Cincinnati, Ohio.
 September 5 – The first through train from San Francisco, California, arrives in Los Angeles, California, after traveling over the Southern Pacific's newly completed Tehachapi Loop.

October events
 October 16 – The Miami Valley Narrow Gauge Railway officially changes its name to Miami Valley Railway.
 October 24 – The British minister Thomas Wade and the Chinese viceroy Shen Pao-chen sign "The Articles of Purchasing the Woosung Railway", which commits the Chinese to providing the railway's owners Tls. 285,000 in three installments over the course of the next year, after which they would acquire complete ownership and management of the line.

November events 
 November 26 – The Ihrhove–Nieuweschans railway opens.

December events
 December 1 – The Woosung Road opens for traffic along the complete line between north Shanghai and Wusong.
 December 4 – The Compagnie Internationale des Wagons-Lits is founded in Brussels.
 December 29 – Ashtabula River railroad disaster: Lake Shore & Michigan Southern Railway Train No. 5, The Pacific Express, collapses the Ashtabula River bridge at Ashtabula, Ohio, dropping eleven passenger cars into a fire started by the car stoves. Of the 159 people on board, 92 are killed and 64 injured, the worst train disaster in the United States to date.

Unknown date events
 The Atjeh Staats Spoorwegen, a narrow-gauge railway on Sumatra in the Dutch East Indies, opens between Banda Aceh and its port of Ulèë Lheuë.
 The first regularly operated compound locomotives, a series of small 2-cylinder compound 0-4-2 tanks, are built to the design of Anatole Mallet by Schneider of Le Creusot for the Bayonne–Biarritz Railway, France.
 Classification yard opens at Mülheim-Speldorf in Germany.
 Ohio Falls Car Manufacturing Company, later to become part of American Car & Foundry, is founded in Jeffersonville, Indiana.

Accidents
 January 21 – The Abbots Ripton rail accident on the Great Northern Railway (England) kills 13 and injures 53. The accident occurs after a blizzard has reduced visibility and disrupted the signaling system, causing the Special Scotch Express to collide with a coal train and an express train travelling in the other direction to run into the wreckage.

Births

April births
 April 24 – Yury Lomonosov, Russian-born locomotive engineer (d. 1952).

May births
 May 27 – William Stanier, Chief mechanical engineer of the London, Midland & Scottish Railway 1932–1944 (d. 1965).

June births
 June 19 – Nigel Gresley, Chief mechanical engineer of the London & North Eastern Railway 1923–1941 (d. 1941).

Deaths

June deaths
 June 2 – Charles Beyer, German-British steam locomotive manufacturer, co-founder of Beyer, Peacock & Company (born 1813).

References